Boško Lozica (born November 28, 1952 in Korčula, Yugoslavia) is a former water polo player. As a member of Yugoslavia's water polo team he won a silver medal at the 1980 Summer Olympics.

See also
 List of Olympic medalists in water polo (men)

References

External links
 

1952 births
Living people
Yugoslav male water polo players
Olympic medalists in water polo
Olympic silver medalists for Yugoslavia
Olympic water polo players of Yugoslavia
Water polo players at the 1980 Summer Olympics
Water polo players at the 1976 Summer Olympics
Medalists at the 1980 Summer Olympics
People from Korčula
Lozica, Boško